2010 Gamba Osaka season

Competitions

Domestic results

J.League 1

Emperor's Cup

J.League Cup

International results

AFC Champions League

Player statistics

Other pages
 J.League official site

Gamba Osaka
Gamba Osaka seasons